The 2018 MFF  Charity Cup (also known as the 2018 MPT Charity Cup for sponsorship reasons) is the 7th Charity Cup, an annual football match played between the winners of the previous National League and Domestic Cup competitions. It was held at Aung San Stadium on 7 January 2018. The match was played between Shan United, champions of the 2018 Myanmar National League and Yangon United, runner-up of the 2018 Myanmar National League.

This was Yangon United's 4th Cup appearance and Shan United's 2nd time Cup appearance, they won Charity Cup for the first time as Kanbawza FC in 2016.

Background and pre-match

Shan United qualified for the 2018 MFF Charity Cup as winners of the 2017 Myanmar National League. It was the club's first time ever league title in 9 years. The other Charity Cup place went to Yangon United, who was defeated by Shan United in Domestic final and a runner-up of 2017 Myanmar National League.

Yangon United made their fifth appearance in the Charity Cup; prior to this they won twice (2013,2016) and lost twice, most recently in 2016 against Ayeyawady United. By contrast, Shan United made their twice Chairity Cup appearance, and won once (2014). They went into the match as holders of the MNL Champion, having defeated Yangon United a year earlier. Both clubs had only one time met before in the Shield, when Shan United (as Kanbawza FC) won 2-0 in 2014.

MFF donates Ticket fees to Orphan School and other places 

The 2017 edition was the first competitive fixture in English football to trial the ABBA penalty shoot-out system, provided scores were level after 90 minutes. The format is similar to a tiebreak in tennis, and is designed "to prevent the team going second from having to play catch-up." Unlike a traditional penalty shoot-out, which sees Team A and Team B alternate spot-kicks in an ABAB pattern, the ABBA format follows an 'AB BA AB BA' order.

Match

Team selection

Details

Statistics

References

MFF Charity Cup
2018 in Burmese football